This is a 'list of châteaux in the Midi-Pyrénées, France.

 Ariège 
Castelet du Castet in Aleu, dating from the 17th or 18th century
Château d’Alliat in Alliat
Château d'Artix in Artix
Château d'Arvigna in Arvigna (Cathar)
Château d'Aucazein in Aucazein
Château de Montréal-de-Sos in Auzat
Château d'Aynat in Bédeilhac-et-Aynat (ruined)
Château de Castelbon in Betchat
Château des Salenques in Les Bordes-sur-Arize
Château de Marveille in Les Bordes-sur-Arize
Château de Ligny in Les Bordes-sur-Arize
Château de Gudanes in Château-Verdun
Château de Foix in Foix (fortified castle)
Château de Lagarde
Château de Léran in Léran
Château de Lordat in Lordat
Château de Miglos in Miglos
Château de Montaillou in Montaillou
Château de Montségur in Montségur (ruined)
Château de Prat in Prat-Bonrepaux
Château de Quérigut in Quérigut (ruined)
Château de Roquefixade in Roquefixade (ruined)
Château de Rouze in Rouze
Château d'Usson in Rouze (ruined)

 Aveyron 

Château de Balsac in Balsac
Château de Bertholène in Bertholène (ruined)
Château de Belcastel in Belcastel
Château du Bosc in Naucelle
Château de Bournazel
Château de Brousse in Brousse-le-Château
Château de Brusque in Brusque
Château de Calmont d'Olt, in Espalion (ruined)
Château de Coupiac in Coupiac, (fortified castle)
Château d'Estaing in Estaing
Château de Fayet in Fayet
Château de Floyrac in Onet-le-Château
Château de Fontanges in Onet-le-Château
Château de Gissac in Gissac
Château de Graves
Château de Guizard in Villecomtal
Château de Kermaria, 19th century in Morlhon-le-Haut
Château de Lacaze (Peyrusse) in Peyrusse-le-Roc
Château de Latour-sur-Sorgues in Marnhagues-et-Latour
Château de Masse in Espalion
Château de Montaigut in Gissac
Château de Montalègre in Versols-et-Lapeyre
Château de Najac in Najac
Château d'Onet-le-Château in Onet-le-Château
Château de Vabre in Onet-le-Château (Renaissance château)
Domaine de Vialatelle in Onet-le-Château
Château de Pagax in Flagnac (ruined)
Château de Peyrelade in Rivière-sur-Tarn
Château de Peyrusse-le-Roc, in Peyrusse-le-Roc (ruined)
Château de Planèze in Luc-la-Primaube
Château du Puech in Villecomtal
Château de Pomayrols
Château de Pruines in Pruines
Château de Saint-Izaire in Saint-Izaire
Château de Selves, 15th century, modified in the 18th century, in La Vinzelle commune of Grand-Vabre
Château de la Servayrie in Mouret
Château de Sévérac in Sévérac-le-Château (fortified castle)
Château de Sorgue in Sorgue
Château de Taurines in Centrès
Château de Valon in Lacroix-Barrez
Château de Versols in Versols-et-Lapeyre
Château de Vézins in Vézins-de-Lévézou

 Gers Ancient province of GasconySee Château gascon
Château d’Ampelle in Pergain-Taillac
Château d'Avezan in Avezan
Château de Bassoues in Bassoues
Château du Busca-Maniban in Mansencôme
Château de Castelmore in Lupiac
Château de Caumont in Cazaux-Savès
Château de Fieux in Miradoux
Château de Fourcès in Fourcès
Château de Herrebouc in Saint-Jean-Poutge
Château de Lacassagne in Saint-Avit-Frandat
Château de Larressingle in Larressingle
Château de Loubersan in Loubersan
Château de Lasserre in Béraut
Château de Lavardens in Lavardens
Château de Maignaut in Maignaut-Tauzia
Château de Manlèche in Pergain-Taillac
Château de Mansencôme in Mansencôme
Château de Masseube in Masseube
Château de Mirande in Mirande
Château de Montaut-les-Créneaux in Montaut-les-Créneaux
Château de Plieux in Plieux
Château de Rouillac in Gimbrède
Château de Sainte-Mère, at Sainte-Mère
Château de Simorre, at Simorre
Château du Tauzia, at Maignaut-Tauzia
 Tour de Termes d'Armagnac, at Termes-d'Armagnac, listed, visitable, fortified chateau
Château de Labarrère, at Labarrère
Château de Cassaigne, at Cassaigne
Château de Castelnau d'Auzan, at Castelnau-d'Auzan

Haute-Garonne 

Château d'Aigrefeuille in Aigrefeuille
Château d'Alliez (Cedar Clinic) in Cornebarrieu
Château d'Aurignac, in Aurignac
Château d'Azas, in Azas
Château Lafont in Bagnères-de-Luchon
Château de Bonrepos in Bonrepos-Riquet
Château de Boussan, in Boussan
Château de Brax, in Brax
Château du Cabirol in Colomiers
Château de Calmont, in Calmont
Château de Cambiac, in Cambiac
Château de la Cassagnère  in Cugnaux
Château de Castagnac, in Castagnac
Château Catala in Saint-Orens-de-Gameville
Château de Cornebarrieu in Cornebarrieu
Château du Coustela in Gratentour
Palais des Evêques du Comminges in Alan
Château de Fonbeauzard in Fonbeauzard
Château de Fourquevaux, in Fourquevaux
Château de Gagnac in Gagnac-sur-Garonne
Château de Galié, in Galié
Château de Gensac-sur-Garonne in Gensac-sur-Garonne
Château de Gourdan-Polignan in Gourdan-Polignan
Château de Grand Selve, in Toulouse
Château de Hautpoul in Cugnaux
Château d'Izaut-de-l'Hôtel in Izaut-de-l'Hôtel
Château de Jean, in Villariès
Château de Juzes, in Juzes
Château de Labastide-Paumès, in Labastide-Paumès
Château de Lacroix in Lacroix-Falgarde
Château de Lafitte-Vigordane in Lafitte-Vigordane
Château de Laran in Cornebarrieu
Château de Laréole, in Laréole
Château de Larroque, in Larroque
Château de Latoue, in Latoue
Château de Launac, in Launac
Château de Launaguet in Launaguet
Château de Loubens-Lauragais, to Loubens-Lauragais, listed, visitable, fortified chateau
Le Pavillon Louis XVI and its park in Cugnaux
Château de Maurens in Cugnaux
Château de Merville, in Merville
Château de Montespan, in Montespan
Château de Novital in Gagnac-sur-Garonne
Château de Percin in Seilh
Château de Pibrac, in Pibrac
Château de Pinsaguel, in Pinsaguel
Château de Pontié in Cornebarrieu
Château des Raspaud in Colomiers
Château des Ramassiers in Colomiers
Château de Redon : in Lagardelle-sur-Lèze 18th century
Château de la Renery in Gratentour
Château de Reynerie, in Toulouse
Château de Rochemontès in Seilh
Château de Rudelle, in Muret
Château de Saint-Élix-le-Château, in Saint-Élix-le-Château
Château de Saint-Élix-Séglan Château, in Saint-Élix-Séglan
Château de Sainte-Marie, in Longages
Château de Saint-Félix-Lauragais, in Saint-Félix-Lauragais
Château de Saint-Jory, in Saint-Jory
Château de Saint-Paul-d'Oueil, in Saint-Paul-d'Oueil
Château de la Salvetat-Saint-Gilles, in La Salvetat-Saint-Gilles
Château de Sarremezan, in Sarremezan
Château des Sœurs :  in Lagardelle-sur-Lèze 16th century
Château de Tournefeuille in Tournefeuille
Château de Vallègue, in Vallègue
Château de Valmirande, in Montréjeau
Château de Vieillevigne, in Vieillevigne
Château du Vignaou : in Lagardelle-sur-Lèze end of the 18th century, renovated in 1998
Château de Villefranche, in Villeneuve-lès-Bouloc

 Hautes-Pyrénées Ancient province of Gascony''
Château d' Adé in Adé (ruins)
Château fort de Lourdes, in Lourdes
Château de Luz-Saint-Sauveur, in Luz-Saint-Sauveur
Château de Mauvezin, in Mauvezin
Château de Siradan, in Siradan

Lot 
The department of Lot possesses about 500 châteaux-like homes.

Château d'Assier, at Assier  (renaissance)
 Château de Barasc, at Béduer
Château de la Blainie, at Albas
Château de Caïx, at Luzech
Château de Capdenac, at Capdenac
Château de Castelnau-Bretenoux, at Prudhomat
 Château de Chambert, at Floressas
Château de Charry, at Montcuq
Château des Doyens, at Carennac
Château de Fontauda, at Montcuq
Château Lagrézette or Château de La Grézette, at Caillac
 Château de Lantis, at Dégagnac
Château de Larroque-Toirac, at Larroque-Toirac
 Château de Mercuès, at Mercuès
 Château de Montal at Saint-Jean-Lespinasse
Château de Montcuq, at Montcuq
Château de La Pannonie, at Couzou
 Château de Pechrigal, at Saint-Clair
Château de Pleysse, at Montcuq
Château de Rocamadour, at Rocamadour
Château de Ventalays, at Montcuq

Tarn 

Château Labastidié at Florentin (vineyard)
Château d'Aiguefonde at Aiguefonde
Château-musée du Cayla at Andillac
Château d'Arifat at Arifat
Château de Gos at Barre
Château de Brassac at Brassac
Château de La Bourélie at Brens
Château de Salettes at Cahuzac-sur-Vère
Château de la Serre at Cambounet-sur-le-Sor
Château de Castelnau-de-Lévis at Castelnau-de-Lévis
Château de Corduriès at Castelnau-de-Montmiral
Château de Fézembat at Castelnau-de-Montmiral
Château de Mazières at Castelnau-de-Montmiral
Château de Meyragues at Castelnau-de-Montmiral
Château de Curvalle at Curvalle
Château de Castellas at Dourgne
Château de Combefa at Combefa
Château de Ferrières at Ferrières
Château de Fiac (Tarn) at Fiac
Château de Florentin at Florentin
Château de Lagassié at Garrigue
Pech Massou at Giroussens
Château de Belbèze at Giroussens
Château de Lézignac at Graulhet
Château du Travet at Labastide-Saint-Georges
Château de Lacaze (Tarn) at Lacaze
Château de Camalières at Lacaze
Château de Magrin at Magrin
Château de Mailhoc at Mailhoc
Château d'en Clausade at Marzens
Château du Masnau-Massuguiès at Le Masnau-Massuguiès
Château de Massaguel at Massaguel
Château d'Hautpoul at Mazamet
Château du Milhars at Milhars
Château de Montfa at Montfa
Château de Montpinier at Montpinier
Château du Poutac at Moularès
Château de le Vergnet at Moularès
Château de Mouzieys-Panens at Mouzieys-Panens
Château de Boissezon (tower) à Murat-sur-Vèbre (ruins)
Château de Canac at Murat-sur-Vèbre
Château de Nages at Nages
Château de Montespieu at Navès
Château de Penne at Penne
Château de Montlédier at Pont-de-Larn
Château du Tour in Prades
Château des capitaines-gouverneurs in Puycelsi
Château Cap de Castel in Puylaurens
Château de Rayssac in Rayssac
Château de Roquevidal in Roquevidal
Château de Saint-Agnan in Saint-Agnan
Château de La Bancalié in Saint-Antonin-de-Lacalm
Château de Labastide vassals in Saint-Grégoire
Château de Cussac in Saint-Grégoire
Château de Saint-Martin-Laguépie in Saint-Martin-Laguépie
Château de Sendrone in Saïx
Château de Salvagnac in Salvagnac  (ruined)
Château de la Bonnette in Senouillac
Château de Linardié in Senouillac
Château de Saint-Martial in Senouillac
Château de Mauriac in Senouillac
Château de Grandval in Teillet
Château de Trévien in Trévien

Tarn-et-Garonne 
Château d'Auty in Auty
Château de Bioule, in Bioule
Château de Bouillac in Bouillac (Tarn-et-Garonne)
Château de Bruniquel, in Bruniquel
Château de Castelferrus in Castelferrus
Château de Cas in Espinas
Château de Caylus et garenne de Mondésir, in Caylus
Château de Glatens in Glatens  (ruined)
Château de Gramont in Gramont
Château de Labarthe in Labarthe
Château du Clau in Labastide-Saint-Pierre
Château abbatial de Larrazet in Larrazet
Château à La Roque de Loze in Loze  (ruined)
Château de Mansonville in Mansonville
Château de Montricoux in Montricoux
Château de Monteils in Monteils
Château de Lesparre in Montfermier  (ruined)
château-fort de Montgaillard in Montgaillard, (château fort)
Château de Nègrepelisse in Négrepelisse
Château de Saint-Roch in Le Pin
Château de Piquecos in Piquecos
Chateau de Pompignan on the D820 at Pompignan, about 25 km northwest of Toulouse
Château de Reyniès in Reyniès
Château de Saint-Clair in Saint-Clair
Château Souloumiac in Saint-Nauphary
Château de Saint-Nicolas-de-la-Grave in Saint-Nicolas-de-la-Grave
Château de la Salle de Savenès in Savenès
Château de Belpech in Varen
Château de Blauzac in Vazerac
Château de la "Reine Margot" in Verdun-sur-Garonne

Notes and references

See also
 List of castles in France